Twelve correctional institutions in Jamaica are operated by the Department of Correctional Services for the Ministry of National Security.

Contemporary institutions

Adult
Centres for men and women:
 The South Camp Adult Correctional Centre (SCACC) 
 New Broughton Sunset Adult Correctional Centre (NBSACC) - For elderly men
 Richmond Farm adult Correctional Centre (RFACC) 
 St. Catherine Adult Correctional Centre (ST.CACC) - Reception centre
 Tamarind Farm Correctional Centre (TFACC) 
 Tower Street Adult Correctional Centre (TSACC) - Reception centre

Centres for women:
 Fort Augusta Adult Correctional Centre (FAACC) – Reception centre

Juvenile
There are three juvenile correctional centres:
Armadale Juvenile Correctional Centre. (Alexandria, St. Ann Parish) - This is the centre for girls - Capacity of 40
Hill Top Juvenile Correctional Centre. (Bamboo, St. Ann Parish) - Capacity of 98
Rio Cobre Juvenile Correctional Centre. (Tredegar Park, Spanish Town, St. Catherine Parish) - Capacity of 120

Remand
There are two remand centres:
Horizon Adult Remand Centre (HARC)
Saint Andrew Juvenile Remand Centre. (Stony Hill, St. Andrew Parish) - Capacity of 48

In addition, many remand prisoners are held in police station gaols.

Historic institutions
Old Jail in St Ann's Bay
Saint Jago Women's Centre

See also

List of schools in Jamaica

References

External links
Since 2004, the Department of Correctional Services has published comprehensive annual statistics.

Prisons in Jamaica
Prisons
Jamaica